Oxynoemacheilus cinicus is a species of Cypriniformes fish in the genus Oxynoemacheilus. It is little known and is most likely from western Anatolia and the Büyük Menderes River.

Footnotes 
 

cinicus
Endemic fauna of Turkey
Fish described in 2007
Taxa named by Füsun Erk'akan
Taxa named by Teodor T. Nalbant
Taxa named by Cevher Özeren